Adi Kumbeswarar Temple, Kumbakonam is a Hindu temple dedicated to Lord Shiva, located in the town of Kumbakonam in Thanjavur District Tamil Nadu, India. Shiva is worshiped as Adi Kumbeswarar, and is represented by the lingam. His consort Parvati is depicted as Mangalambigai Amman. The presiding deity is revered in the 7th century Tamil Saiva canonical, greatest work, the Tevaram, written by Tamil saint poets known as the Nayanmars and classified as Paadal Petra Sthalam.

The tallest is the eastern tower, with 11 stories and a height of  The temple has numerous shrines, with those of Kumbeswarar and Mangalambigai Amman being the most prominent. The temple complex houses many halls; the most notable is the sixteen-pillared hall built during the Vijayanagar period that has all the 27 stars and 12 zodiacs sculpted in a single stone.

The temple has six daily rituals at various times from 5:30 a.m. to 9 p.m., and twelve yearly festivals on its calendar, with the Masi Magam festival celebrated during the Tamil month of Maasi (February - March) being the most prominent.

The present masonry structure was built during the Chola dynasty in the 9th century, while later expansions are attributed to Vijayanagar rulers of the Thanjavur Nayaks of the 16th century. The temple is maintained and administered by the Hindu Religious and Charitable Endowments Department of the Government of Tamil Nadu.

Legend
The name of the town Kumbakonam is derived from the legend associated with Kumbeswarar Temple. The pot (kumbha) is said to be of Lord Brahma that contained the seed of all living beings on earth. The kumbha is believed to have been displaced by a pralaya (dissolution of the universe) effected by Lord Shiva's arrow and ultimately came to rest at the spot where the town of Kumbakonam now stands. The nectar is believed to have fallen in two places - the Mahamaham tank and the Potramarai tank. This event is now commemorated in the Mahamaham festival held every 12 years. Kumbakonam was also formerly known by the Tamil name of Kudamukku. Kumbakonam is also identified with the Sangam age settlement of Kudavayil.

History
The temple is in existence from Chola times of the 9th century, and has been maintained by Nayaks during the 15-17th century. In modern times, the temple is maintained and administered by the Hindu Religious and Charitable Endowments Department of the Government of Tamil Nadu.

Architecture

The tallest is the eastern tower, with 11 stories and a height of 
There are five silver-plated chariots in the temple used to carry the temple deities during festive occasions. The temple is the largest Shiva temple of Kumbakonam and has a 9-storeyed rajagopuram (gateway tower) 125 ft tall   It is spread over 4 acres in the centre of the town. The temple has 3 concentric compounds, elongated along an east–west axis has triple set of gopurams.

Adi Kumbeswarar is the presiding deity of the temple and the shrine is located in the centre.  Kumbeswarar is in the form a lingam believed to have been made by Shiva himself when he mixed nectar of immortality and sand.  Manthrapeeteswari Mangalambika is his consort and her shrine is present parallel to the left of Kumbeswarar shrine. The temple has a colonnaded hall and a good collection of silver vahanas (sacred vehicles used to carry deities during festival processions)  Beyond the flagstaff, a hallway whose columns feature painted brackets representing yali (a mythological creature) leads to the gopuram.  The Navarathiri Mandapam (Hall of Navrathri celebration) has 27 stars and 12 rasis (constellations) carved in a single block. The idol of Subramanya having six hands instead of 12, stone nadaswarams (pipe instrument) and Kiratamurti are main attractions of the temple.

The central shrine of the temple houses the image of Adi Kumbheswarar in the form of lingam The shrine of Mangala Nayaki is located parallel to the left of Kumbeswarar and Somaskanda is located to the right. The images of Nalvars (Appar, Sambanthar, Sundarar and Manickavasagar), images of the sixty three Nayanmars, Virabhadra, Saptakannikas, Visalakshi, Visvanatha, Valam Chuzhi Vinayaka, Bhikshatana, Karthikeya, Annapurani, Gajalakshmi, Mahalakshmi, Saraswathi, Jasta Devi, Durga, Chandikesa, Kuratirtha, Arukala Vinayakar, Nandi, Bali peetham, Sabha Vinayaka, Kasi Visvanatha, Nataraja are located in the first precinct around the sanctum. The temple also has images of Navaneetha Vinayaka, Kiratamurti, Bhairava, Jvarahareswara, Chaota Sri Govinda Dikshits-Nagammal, Chandra, Surya, Adikara Nandhi (the sacred bull of Shiva), Vallabha Ganapathi, Shanmukha, Navagraha (nine planetary deities), Nandhi, Lakshmi Narayana Perumal, Mutra Veli Vinayaka, Bala Dandayutapani, Nandhi, Vanni Vinayakar, Kumbha Munisiddhar, Kumarappar, Adilinga and Sattananthar. Chamber of repose, decoration hall, Sacrificial hall, grand kitchen, marriage hall, elephant shed, Vasantamandapam, cattle shed, garden and four-pillared hall are other notable parts in the temple. The flag mast is located in the second precinct, directly on the axis of the presiding deity.

The Mahamaham tank, Potramarai Tirtha, Varuna Tirtha, Kasyapa Tirtha, Chakkara Tirtha, Matanga Tirtha and Bhagavad Tirtha (bathing ghats along the river Cauvery) are the seven outlying water bodies associated with the temple. Mangala Kupam Asva, Naga tirtha, Kura tirtha are the three wells, while Chandra tirtha, Surya tirtha, Gautama tirtha and Varaha tirtha are the four tanks located inside the temple. The Potramarai tank separates the Kumbeswarar temple from Sarangapani temple.

Festivals

The Mahamaham festival takes place once every twelve years during the Tamil Month of Masi (February–March), when lakhs of pilgrims from various parts of India visit Kumbakonam to take a holy bath in the sacred Mahamaham tank which is located in the heart of the town. The festival has archaeological and epigraphical evidence.  Tulapurushadaram, the practise of weighing oneself against gold and donating to the temple was effected by Govinda Dikshitar and the funds were utilised for funding the construction of the 16 mandapas around the tank. Krishnadeva Raya (1509–1529 CE) is believed to have witnessed the Mahamaham festival during this time. He made donations to the temple on this occasion is found in another inscription.

Twelve Shiva temples are connected with Mahamaham festival which happens once in 12 years in Kumbakonam. They are Kasi Viswanathar Temple, Kumbeswarar Temple, Someswarar Temple, Nageswaran temple, Kalahasteeswarar Temple, Gowthameswarar Temple, Kottaiyur Kodeeswarar temple, Amirthakalasanathar Temple, Banapuriswarar Temple, Abimukeswarar Temple, Kumbakonam, Kambatta Visvanathar Temple and Ekambareswarar Temple.

Worship practices

The temple priests perform the puja (rituals) during festivals and on a daily basis. Like other Shiva temples of Tamil Nadu, the priests belong to the Shaiva community, a Brahmin sub-caste. The temple rituals are performed six times a day; Ushathkalam at 5:30 a.m., Kalasanthi at 8:00 a.m., Uchikalam at 10:00 a.m., Sayarakshai at 5:00 p.m., Irandamkalam at 7:00 p.m. and Ardha Jamam at 8:00 p.m. Each ritual comprises four steps: abhisheka (sacred bath), alangaram (decoration), naivethanam (food offering) and deepa aradanai (waving of lamps) for both Kumbeswarar and Mangalambikai. The worship is held amidst music with nagaswaram (pipe instrument) and tavil (percussion instrument), religious instructions in the Vedas (sacred texts) read by priests and prostration by worshippers in front of the temple mast.

Literary Mention and religious importance
Appar, the 7th-century Tamil Shivite saint poet and nayanar has revered Kumbeswarar and the temple in his verses in Tevaram, compiled as the Fifth Tirumurai. As the temple is revered in Tevaram, it is classified as Paadal Petra Sthalam, one of the 276 temples that find mention in the Saiva canon. The temple is counted as the seventh in the list of temples in the southern banks of Cauvery. Appar has glorified the temple in nine poems referring the place as Kudamuku and the deity as "Kumbesar". The mention is found in the 59th poem in the Third Tirumurai by Sambandar and 22nd poem in the Fifth Tirumurai by Appar. The temple is one of the Shakti Peethas where Parvathi, the consort of Shiva is consecrated as a major deity. Mangalambigai is known as Mantira Piteswari The temple is counted as one of the temples built on the banks of River Kaveri. The temple was visited by Purandara Dasa, who is known as pithamaha (doyen) of Carnatic music, and composed a song glorifying the main deity Sri Kumbeshwara in his song, "Chandrachuda Shivashnkara Parvathi Ramana" and mentions as "kumbapura vasanu neene".

Kumbakonam Sapta Stana Temple
This is one of the Saptha Stana Temples of Kumbakonam. During the Mahahaman of 2016 the palanquin festival was held on 7 February 2016. Following the tirttavari held at Mahamaham tank on 21 April 2016, the palanquin festival of the Sapta Stana Temples were held on 23 April 2016. The festival which started from Kumbesvara Temple at the 7.30 p.m. of 23 April 2016 completed on the morning of 25 April 2016 after going to the following temples.  
 
 Adi Kumbeswarar Temple, Kumbakonam  
 Amirthakadeswarar Temple, Sakkottai  
 Avudainathar Temple, Darasuram 
 Kabartheeswarar Temple 
 Kottaiyur Kodeeswarar Temple 
 Kailasanathar Temple, Melakaveri
 Swaminatha Swamy Temple

Notes

References

.

External links
 Adi Kumbeswarar Pooja schedule for Mahamaham 2016

Photogallery 

 
Hindu temples in Kumbakonam
Shiva temples in Thanjavur district